Mohaupt is a German surname. Notable people with the surname include:

  (1854–1916), Bohemian composer, pedagogue and author (Ernst Schelmerding)
 Richard Mohaupt (1904–1957), German-U.S. composer and Kapellmeister
 Henry Mohaupt (1915–2001), Swiss American inventor
  (born 1942), German Lutheran theologian and politician (CDU)
 Tino Mohaupt (born 1983), German athlete
 Johannes Mohaupt (1898-1973), inventor of the Johannes Mohaupt Theory

See also
 Mohnhaupt
 Monhaupt

German-language surnames